Samvel Gasparyan is an Armenian weightlifter. He won the bronze medal in the men's 102kg event at the 2022 World Weightlifting Championships held in Bogotá, Colombia. He won the gold medal in the men's 102kg event at the 2021 European Weightlifting Championships held in Moscow, Russia.

At the 2019 European Weightlifting Championships held in Batumi, Georgia, he won the silver medal in the men's 102kg event.

He also competed in the men's 102 kg event at the 2021 World Weightlifting Championships held in Tashkent, Uzbekistan.

References

External links 
 

Living people
Year of birth missing (living people)
Place of birth missing (living people)
Armenian male weightlifters
European Weightlifting Championships medalists
World Weightlifting Championships medalists
21st-century Armenian people